Santiago Felipe Llaver (August 12, 1916 in Mendoza – July 14, 2002) was an Argentine politician of the Radical Civic Union. Born in San Martin, he was elected governor of the Mendoza Province in the first elections after the National Reorganization Process in 1983. His term ended in 1987 and José Bordón succeeded him as governor.

Llaver is remembered for the taking of the "Nihuil" hydroelectric power stations on the Atuel River, in a breach of contract by the National Government in order to transfer money to complete the work.

References 

1916 births
2002 deaths
Governors of Mendoza Province
People from Mendoza, Argentina
Radical Civic Union politicians